Iolaus stenogrammica is a butterfly in the family Lycaenidae. It is found in Uganda, western Kenya, north-western Tanzania, the Democratic Republic of the Congo (Sankuru) and Zambia. The habitat consists of forests.

The larvae feed on Globimetula braunii and Agelanthus krausei.

References

Butterflies described in 1928
Iolaus (butterfly)